Asterix and Obelix: God Save Britannia directed by Laurent Tirard, a sequel to Asterix at the Olympic Games (2008), it is the fourth installment in the Asterix film series after Asterix & Obelix vs Caesar (1999), Asterix & Obelix: Mission Cleopatra (2002), and Asterix at the Olympic Games (2008). The film is adapted into 3D and had its World Premiere in September 2012. It is a live-action film from Fidélité Films and is based on Asterix in Britain (1965) and Asterix and the Normans (1966).

Plot
Julius Caesar lands in Britain, where a small village still holds out bravely against the Roman legions. But the situation becomes critical and the villagers have not got long to live; that's when Anticlimax, one of the villagers seeks volunteers to go seek help from his second-cousin Asterix the Gaul and bring back a barrel of "magic potion" from the Breton village of the indomitable heroes.

Cast

 Edouard Baer as Asterix
 Gérard Depardieu as Obelix
 Fabrice Luchini as Julius Caesar
 Catherine Deneuve as the Queen Cordelia 
 Gérard Jugnot as Redbeard
 Valérie Lemercier as Miss Macintosh
 Guillaume Gallienne as Anticlimax 
 Charlotte Le Bon as Ophelia, Anticlimax's fiancée
 Vincent Lacoste as Justforkix
 Dany Boon as Tetedepiaf
 Bouli Lanners as Grossebaf (Olaf Timandahaf)
 Atmen Kelif as Pindépis
 Niccolò Senni as Megacursus
 Jean Rochefort as Senador Lucius Fouinus
 Michel Duchaussoy as Abraracourcix
 László Baranyi as Panoramix
 Tristán Ulloa as Claudius Lapsus
 Vincent Moscato as Pilliébax
 Ginnie Watson as a Breton
 Filippo Timi as a decurion
 Neri Marcorè as a decurion

References

External links
 
 

2012 films
2010s historical films
French historical films
Italian historical films
2010s French-language films
Asterix films
Films set in prehistoric Britain
2012 3D films
French 3D films
Films scored by Klaus Badelt
French sequel films
Films directed by Laurent Tirard
French children's films
Italian children's films
Depictions of Julius Caesar on film
Remakes of French films
Films shot in Hungary
Fiction set in Roman Britain
2010s French films